Cathleen Sutherland is an American film producer. She was nominated for the Academy Award in the category of Best Picture for the 2014 film Boyhood at the 87th Academy Awards.

References

External links 
 

Living people
American film producers
Filmmakers who won the Best Film BAFTA Award
Year of birth missing (living people)